On February 25, 1997, 3 bombs exploded on 3 buses (lines 2, 10, and 44) in Ürümqi, Xinjiang, China. 9 people were killed, including at least 3 children, and a further 28 were injured. Another 2 devices in the south railway station (the main station in Ürümqi) failed to explode. Steel balls, screws, and nails were found in the bombs.

Uyghur separatists had committed the bombings. Responsibility for the attacks was claimed and acknowledged by factions of certain diaspora Uyghurs.

Background
Continuing tensions in Xinjiang have been a source of terrorism in China. Conflicts over Uyghur cultural aspirations resurfaced during the 1960s. In early February 1997, the execution of 30 suspected separatists who had been involved in the organization of Meshrep during Ramadan resulted in large demonstrations, culminating in the Gulja incident on February 5, where at least 9 protesters were killed.

External reference
新疆遭遇的暴力恐怖事件(cn) 
新疆曾遭遇暴力恐怖高峰(cn)

References

Mass murder in 1997
Terrorist incidents in China
Bus bombings in Asia
Improvised explosive device bombings in China
Urumqi 1997
China
Terrorist incidents in China in 1997